Harambe was a gorilla shot and killed by staff at the Cincinnati Zoo in 2016 after a child climbed into his enclosure.

Harambe may also refer to:

Harambe (statue), 2021, New York City
 Harambe, a fictional East African village in Disney's Animal Kingdom
 "Harambe (Working Together for Freedom)", a 1988 song by Rita Marley
 "Harambe", a 2016 song by Young Thug from his mixtape Jeffery

See also
 "RIP Harambe", a 2019 song by Elon Musk
 Harambee (disambiguation)